Cristian Toncheff (born 25 March 1982) is a professional Argentinean footballer and coach, who currently plays for Gibraltar Football League side Mons Calpe.

Career
Starting his career in his native Argentina at Boca Juniors, Toncheff spent the majority of his career in the Argentine lower leagues before a move to Europe in 2007. In 2013 he moved to Gibraltar to sign for Europa and quickly established himself as a prolific scorer, in 2014 and 2015, and was the first Argentine footballer to play in the Bahraini Premier League when he joined Bahrain SC in 2017. He has also enjoyed a career in beach soccer.

References

1982 births
Living people
Argentine footballers
Association football forwards

Bahrain SC players
CF Gimnástico Alcázar players
Club Atlético Colegiales (Argentina) players
Deportivo Morón footballers
Europa F.C. players
San Martín de Mendoza footballers
GCE Villaralbo
Huracán Corrientes
Manchester 62 F.C. players
UB Conquense footballers